Upsilon Pegasi, Latinised from υ Pegasi, is a star within the great square in the northern constellation of Pegasus. It has the proper name Alkarab . This object has a yellow-white hue and is faintly visible to the naked eye with an apparent magnitude of 4.40. It is located at a distance of approximately 170 light-years from the Sun based on parallax, but is drifting closer with a radial velocity of −8.6 km/s. The star is moving through the galaxy at a speed of 50.6 km/s relative to the Sun. Its projected galactic orbit carries it between 18,600 and 26,300 light-years from the center of the galaxy.

This object is an aging giant star with a stellar classification of F8III. It is currently in the Hertzsprung gap and is a source of X-ray emission. The star has 2.2 times the mass of the Sun and is spinning with a projected rotational velocity of 73.4 km/s. It has an iron abundance of −0.01 dex, or 97.7% of the Sun's.

Nomenclature 

υ Pegasi is the star's Bayer designation. The star bore the traditional Arabic name Al Karab ("the Bucket-rope"). In 2016, the IAU organized a Working Group on Star Names (WGSN) to catalog and standardize proper names for stars. The WGSN approved the name Alkarab for this star on 5 September 2017 and it is now so included in the List of IAU-approved Star Names.

References

F-type giants
High-proper-motion stars
Pegasus (constellation)
Pegasi, Upsilon
BD+22 4833
Pegasi, 68
220657
115623
8905
Alkarab